Sarah Marie Vaillancourt (born May 8, 1985) is a Canadian women's ice hockey player. She is a member of the Canada women's national team and a member of Montreal Stars (CWHL).

2-time Olympic Gold Medallist / World Championships Gold / 4-time World Championships Silver / Clarkson Cup Champion (2010–11). From 2003 to 2009 Vaillancourt played 88 international games for Team Canada and scored 36 goals adding 39 assists. She won 2 Olympic Gold medals for Canada, in 2006 and 2010. While playing for Harvard University she was named the Ivy League and ECAC Hockey Player of the Year. She led Harvard in scoring, and was ranked fourth overall in the NCAA in 2007–08. In 2008, she won the coveted Patty Kazmaier Award.

Vaillancourt started skating at the age of two years and a half and playing hockey at five years. She made the national team when she was 18 and one of her favourite hockey moments is winning gold on home soil at the Vancouver 2010 Olympic Games. She studied psychology at Harvard University and works as a skills coach. Vaillancourt is openly lesbian.

Playing career
Vaillancourt was the captain of Canada's under-22 team at the 2007 Air Canada Cup. In 2003, she was the captain of Team Québec at the Canada Winter Games that won the silver medal. One of her teammates was future Olympian Catherine Ward. She graduated from high school as a tri-varsity captain and athlete from Pomfret School in Pomfret, Connecticut, as a member of the class of 2004.

Harvard Crimson
She was a star for the Harvard Crimson women's ice hockey program and won the Patty Kazmaier Award in 2008. Her freshman year was in 2004–05, and she finished fifth in the nation, and first among freshmen, in scoring with 2.31 points per game.

Hockey Canada
In 2005, she made the Canadian national women's hockey team, where she would go on to play at the 2005 Women's World Ice Hockey Championships in Sweden. In her first game ever, she led Canada with 6 points in a 13–0 win over the Kazakhstani national women's ice hockey team. This tied a record for most points in a game on the Canadian national team. She would finish the tournament with 8 points. On February 20, 2006, Vaillancourt, as the second youngest member of the team, won a team gold medal in Turin with the Canadian women's hockey team beating Sweden in the final game and outscoring their opponents 46 to 2.

Montreal Stars
At 2010–11 season, Vaillancourt joined the Montreal Stars midway through the season and instantly become a fan favourite, managing to crack the league's top-10 leading scorers, with an impressive 28 points (11 goals and 17 assists) in only 15 games. In the championship game of the 2011 Clarkson Cup, Vaillancourt scored a goal in the third period. By winning the 2011 Clarkson Cup, Vaillancourt became an unofficial member of the Triple Gold Club (the accomplishment by women is not yet officially recognized by the IIHF), as she became one of only four women to win the Clarkson Cup, a gold medal in the Winter Olympics, and a gold medal at the IIHF World Women's Championships. The other women include Caroline Ouellette, Jenny Potter and Kim St-Pierre. Surgery in the left hip held her outside the action this 2011–12 season.

Career stats

Hockey Canada

Awards and honours
2004-05 All USCHO.com Rookie Team
Top 10 Finalist for 2007 Patty Kazmaier Award 
First Team All-Ivy League, 2007–08, Harvard (junior), unanimous selection
Ivy League Player of the Year 2007-08, Harvard (junior), unanimous selection
2009 First Team All-Ivy League
2009 First Team All-ECAC 
2009 ECAC Player of the Year 
2011 Clarkson Cup Tournament Most Valuable Player

References

External links
 Profile on Canadian Olympic Committee
 Rock em sock em pro-hockey with women's CWHL league-leading Montreal Stars, The Gazette, January 6, 2012.

1985 births
Living people
Canadian expatriate ice hockey players in the United States
Canadian women's ice hockey forwards
Clarkson Cup champions
French Quebecers
Harvard Crimson women's ice hockey players
Ice hockey people from Quebec
Ice hockey players at the 2006 Winter Olympics
Ice hockey players at the 2010 Winter Olympics
Les Canadiennes de Montreal players
Lesbian sportswomen
LGBT ice hockey players
Canadian LGBT sportspeople
Medalists at the 2006 Winter Olympics
Medalists at the 2010 Winter Olympics
Olympic gold medalists for Canada
Olympic ice hockey players of Canada
Olympic medalists in ice hockey
Patty Kazmaier Award winners
Pomfret School alumni
Sportspeople from Sherbrooke